Wendell Lewis Willkie House, also known as the Cullen-Mauzy-Willkie House, is a historic home located in Rushville, Indiana, that was the home of Republican presidential candidate Wendell Willkie from 1940 to 1944.

Built about 1874, it is a -story, "L"-plan, Italianate brick dwelling, with a slate hipped roof, and sitting on a limestone foundation. It features segmental arched openings, paired scroll brackets, decorative rosettes, projecting bay, and a replacement porch built about 1900.

The house was listed in the National Register of Historic Places in 1993.

References

Houses on the National Register of Historic Places in Indiana
Italianate architecture in Indiana
Houses completed in 1874
Buildings and structures in Rush County, Indiana
National Register of Historic Places in Rush County, Indiana